C. V. Raman Global University is an engineering and management institution located in Bhubaneswar, Odisha, India. It was established in 1997 as C.V. Raman College of Engineering by Sanjib Kumar Rout under C.V. Raman Group of Institutions. The institute is accredited by the National Board of Accreditation (NBA) and is certified to ISO 9001:2000 quality.

The institute is rated "A" by National Assessment and Accreditation Council (NAAC) and is affiliated to Biju Patnaik University of Technology (BPUT). On 29 February 2020, the college was granted university status and was renamed C. V. Raman Global University.

Academics 

The college offers four-year undergraduate B.Tech degree programs and two-year postgraduate degree  M.Tech programs. It also offers a three-year postgraduate degree program in Master of Computer Applications, two-year master's degree in MBA and three-year B.Tech degree for diploma holders under lateral entry scheme with the approval of All India Council for Technical Education (AICTE) and affiliated under Biju Patnaik University of Technology. It also offers a three-year Diploma in Engineering in various disciplines under Orissa State Council of Technical Education & Vocational Training.

Rankings

C. V. Raman College of Engineering, Bhubaneshwar was ranked 500 among engineering colleges by the National Institutional Ranking Framework (NIRF) in 2021.

References

External links
 

All India Council for Technical Education
Engineering colleges in Odisha
Science and technology in Bhubaneswar
Business schools in Odisha
Universities and colleges in Bhubaneswar
Educational institutions established in 1997
1997 establishments in Orissa